Castaño ( or chestnut tree) may refer to:

People
Castaño (footballer) (1933 - 2019), a Moroccan born Spanish footballer
Carlos Castaño Gil (1965–2004), founder of the Peasant Self-Defense Forces of Córdoba and Urabá (ACCU), an extreme right paramilitary organization in Colombia
Catalina Castaño (born 1979), Colombian tennis player
Cecilia Castaño (born 1953), Spanish academic
Fidel Castaño, right-wing Colombian drug lord and paramilitary, among the founders of Los Pepes and the Peasant Self-Defense Forces of Cordoba and Uraba
Héctor Castaño (born 1965), Colombian road cyclist
Vicente Castaño (born 1957), aka El Profe, Colombian paramilitary former leader of the United Self-Defense Forces of Colombia (AUC), a right-wing paramilitary organization

Other uses
Castaño (peak), highest point in the Sierra de Aracena, Spain
Castaño (bakery), a large Chilean bakery

See also
 Chestnut
 Castano (disambiguation)
 Castagno (disambiguation)